Outlaws is an American Western television series about lawmen pursuing criminals on the American frontier starring Barton MacLane, Don Collier, Jock Gaynor, Wynn Pearce, Bruce Yarnell, Slim Pickens, and Judy Lewis. The show aired on NBC during the 1960–1961 and 1961–1962 television seasons.

Synopsis
During Season 1 (1960–1961), Outlaws depicted United States Marshal Frank Caine and his deputies Will Foreman and Heck Martin, lawmen on the American frontier during the 1870s, 1880s, and 1890s. Based in Guthrie in the Oklahoma Territory, they pursue outlaws across the territory. After the first nine episodes, Martin disappears from Caine′s team and Deputy U.S. Marshal Steve Corbie replaces him. Rather than tell the story from the lawmen′s point of view, each episode depicts events from the viewpoint of the outlaws they are trying to bring to justice, a darker perspective that explores how the outlaws think, what motivates them to break the law, how they plot their crimes, and how they feel about getting caught by lawmen.

In Season 2 (1961–1962), Caine has become the territorial governor, and he, Martin, and Corbie are gone from the series. Still enforcing the law in the Oklahoma Territory, Foreman has been promoted to marshal and now is based in Stillwater, pursuing outlaws with the assistance of his own deputy, Chalk Breeson. Stories are told from the point of view of the lawmen and honest citizens rather than from that of the outlaws. Episodes also portray events in Stillwater, where Slim is the town character who sometimes assists the marshals and Connie Masters works at the Wells Fargo office.

Outlaws sought greater historical accuracy than most television Westerns, depicting real-life outlaws such as the Dalton Gang, Bill Doolin, and Sam Bass and events such as the Land Rush of 1889 in some of its episodes.

Cast
 Barton MacLane...U.S. Marshal Frank Caine (1960–1961)
 Don Collier...Deputy U.S. Marshal Will Foreman (1960–1961)/U.S. Marshal Will Foreman (1961–1962)
 Jock Gaynor...Deputy U.S. Marshal Heck Martin (1960 – 9 episodes)
 Wynn Pearce...Deputy U.S. Marshal Steve Corbie (1960–1961 – 17 episodes)
 Bruce Yarnell...Deputy U.S. Marshal Chalk Breeson (1961–1962)
 Slim Pickens...Slim (1961–1962)
 Judy Lewis...Connie Masters (1961–1962)

Production

Outlaws was filmed at Metro-Goldwyn-Mayer and Paramount Pictures and Frank Telford served as its executive producer. Producers included Robert Bassler, Joseph Dackow, and Telford. Episode directors included Abner Biberman, Walter Doniger, John Florea, Douglas Heyes, Jesse Hibbs, Sobey Martin, Paul Stanley, and Richard Whorf. Episode writers included Doniger, Heyes, Lowell Barrington, Jack Curtis, Norman Katkov, Andy Lewis, Dave Lewis, and Corey Wilbur. Hugo Friedhofer wrote the show′s theme song.

Spike, the dog cast in the 1957 film Old Yeller, appeared in Outlaws. Other guest stars included Jack Elam, Eli Wallach, James Coburn, Warren Oates, Brian Keith, Gerald Mohr, Henry Hull, Jim Davis, Edgar Buchanan, Frank McHugh, Robert Culp, Nancy Kulp, Cliff Robertson, Leo Gordon, Fuzzy Knight, Julie Adams, Preston Foster, Alan Hale Jr., Robert Lansing, Lloyd Nolan, George Kennedy, Vic Morrow, Martin Landau, Jackie Coogan, William Shatner and Cloris Leachman.
 
Season 1 of Outlaws was filmed in black-and-white. Season 2 was in color.

Transogram produced a board game based on Outlaws.

Reception

William Margulies was nominated for the Primetime Emmy Award for Outstanding Cinematography for a Single-Camera Series (One Hour) in 1961 for his work on Outlaws during its first season. At the 13th Primetime Emmy Awards, held on May 16, 1961, he lost to George T. Clemens of The Twilight Zone.

Broadcast history

Outlaws premiered on September 29, 1960, and 26 episodes were produced for its first season, the last of them airing on May 18, 1961. After reruns aired during the summer of 1961, the second season premiered with a revised premise and cast on October 5, 1961, and consisted of 24 episodes. Despite the changes, the show was cancelled after its second season, and its last new episode was broadcast on May 10, 1962, seven weeks after its second-to-last new episode. Prime-time reruns of Outlaws then aired in its regular time slot until September 13, 1962. Outlaws aired on NBC on Thursdays at 7:30 p.m. Eastern Time throughout its 50-episode, two-season run.

Episodes

Season 1 (1960–1961)
SOURCE

Season 2 (1961–1962)
SOURCE]

References

External links

  
 Outlaws closing credits on YouTube
 Outlaws Season 1 Episode 1 "Thirty a Month" on YouTube
 Outlaws Season 1 Episode 3 "Bang the Drum Slowly" on YouTube
 Outlaws Season 1 Episode 5 "Shorty" on YouTube
 Outlaws Season 1 Episode 6 "Last Chance" on YouTube
 Outlaws Season 2 Episode 9 "No Luck on Fridays" on YouTube
 Outlaws Season 2 Episode 20 "No More Horses" on YouTube
 William Shatner in Outlaws Season 1 Episodes 7 and 8 "Starfall" Parts 1 and 2 on YouTube
 Remembering the cast of Outlaws on YouTube

1960s American drama television series
1960 American television series debuts
1962 American television series endings
Black-and-white American television shows
NBC original programming
Television shows set in Oklahoma
English-language television shows